Angela Winbush is the third studio album by American singer-songwriter Angela Winbush, released on March 15, 1994 on Elektra Records. The album features two versions of the Marvin Gaye classic "Inner City Blues"; the album version and a radio edit.

"Inner City Blues" and the lead single "Treat U Rite" were produced by singer-songwriter Chuckii Booker. Also included on the album is "Baby Hold On", a duet with then-husband Ronald Isley.

Reception

AllMusic's Andrew Hamilton rated the album three out of a possible five stars, paying special attention to the lead track "Treat U Rite"; he called it "a tasty mid-tempo romancer that's almost too rich for the music diabetic."

"Treat U Rite" quickly gained heavy rotation on US R&B radio airplay. The song became an R&B hit, and peaked at No. 6 on the Billboard Top R&B Songs chart. The self-titled album reached No. 11 on Billboard's Top R&B Albums chart.

Track listing
All tracks written by Angela Winbush, except where noted.

Personnel
Angela Winbush – lead & backing vocals, keyboards, synthesizers, piano, programming, clavinet, synthesized bass, drums, percussion, drum programming
Gerald Albright – alto saxophone
Chuckii Booker – keyboards, synthesizers, electric bass, acoustic and electric guitars, drums, percussion, drum programming
Sekou Bunch – electric bass, drums, percussion
George Duke – flute, piano
Nathan East – bass
Ernie Isley – acoustic & electric six- and twelve-string guitars, sitar, 12-string bass
Roman Johnson – keyboards, synthesizers, sampling, synthesized bass, drums, percussion, synthesized horns
Herman Matthews – drums, percussion
Michael Schlesinger – keyboards, programmer

Production
Executive producers – Bob Krasnow & Ronald Isley
Recorded & engineered by Conley Abrams, Mike Ross & Raymond Silva
Assistant engineers – Mark Guilbeault, Kenji Nakai, Tim Nitz
Mixing by Conley Abrams, Raymond Silva
Mastered by Greg Calbi
Producer – Angela Winbush (tracks 3–10)

Track & credits

Charts

Weekly charts

Year-end charts

References

External links
Angela Winbush – Angela Winbush album at Amazon

1994 albums
Angela Winbush albums
Elektra Records albums